"She Can't Say I Didn't Cry" is a song written by Troy Martin, Tony Martin and Reese Wilson, and recorded by American country music artist Rick Trevino.  It was released in May 1994 as the third single from his self-titled debut album.  It was his first top ten hit on the country charts, reaching number 3 on the Billboard Hot Country Songs chart and number 11 on the Canadian RPM country Tracks chart in late 1994.

Content
"She Can't Say I Didn't Cry" is a mid-tempo ballad performed primarily with acoustic guitar and piano, being accompanied by steel guitar and drums when the chorus builds up.

The narrator of the song responds to things his former lover said of their relationship by admitting that he can't deny that he broke her heart and did nothing to make her stay. He then says in the chorus that she can't say he didn't cry about it afterward.

Critical reception
Deborah Evans Price, of Billboard magazine reviewed the song negatively saying that while Trevino proves himself to be a "competent ballad singer", the song "doesn't give him a lot to work with."

Music video
The music video was directed by Gerry Wenner and premiered in May 1994.

Chart performance
"She Can't Say I Didn't Cry" debuted at number 66 on the U.S. Billboard Hot Country Singles & Tracks for the week of June 4, 1994.

Year-end charts

References

1994 singles
1994 songs
Rick Trevino songs
Songs written by Tony Martin (songwriter)
Song recordings produced by Steve Buckingham (record producer)
Columbia Records singles
Songs written by Reese Wilson